Historic Associate Reformed Church and Cemetery (also known as Historic Hopewell Church Inc) is a historic church in Morning Sun, Ohio.

History of Hopewell

The Hopewell Associate Reformed Church, now referred to as Historic Hopewell Church, is a landmark on the National Register of Historic Places. It was founded in 1808 by Scotch-Irish Presbyterians who chose to leave their settlement in South Carolina and move to Ohio because of their opposition to slavery. In 1814, Reverend Alexander Porter was appointed as Hopewell's first permanent pastor. As the community grew, the original log church was replaced in 1825 by the brick structure that is the Historic Hopewell Church today.

For over 100 years the church and its members were an active congregation, contributing to the settlement of Ohio and leading abolitionist efforts. Hopewell also served as a frequently used  stop on the Underground Railroad, providing shelter and worship for slaves who sought freedom. Many members of the church  served as conductors on the Underground Railroad.

Throughout the 19th-century, the church community grew so large that at various points in its history, daughter churches were formed in the nearby towns of Fairhaven (1835), Oxford (1837), College Corner (1849), and Morning Sun (1879). In 1915, because of the expansion of the four daughter churches, the Hopewell Church was shuttered. Hopewell remained closed until the 1960s when descendants of the original families and other community members began restoration efforts to create the Historic Hopewell Church we have today.

Hopewell Today

Today, the church is an active community resource and a non-profit organization. More than 150 people are members of the Historic Hopewell Church, helping to fulfill its mission.

The Hopewell Church holds Sunday services every summer in cooperation with other area churches.

A special Christmas service is held each year in December.

Mission Statement

To preserve our heritage and to perpetuate the church's care for future generations. To promote the organization by inviting others to join with us to support this worthy goal. To provide a place of interdenominational worship.

References

External links
 www.historichopewellchurch.org/ Official website of Historic Hopewell]

Presbyterian churches in Ohio
Cemeteries in Preble County, Ohio
Churches on the National Register of Historic Places in Ohio
Federal architecture in Ohio
Churches completed in 1825
Buildings and structures in Preble County, Ohio
National Register of Historic Places in Preble County, Ohio
Associate Reformed Presbyterian Church
Historic districts on the National Register of Historic Places in Ohio